Tenacious D is a comedy rock duo

Tenacious D may also refer to:
Tenacious D (album), the duo's self-titled debut album
Tenacious D (TV series), a television series following the duo
Tenacious D in The Pick of Destiny a film about the duo
Tenacious D in Post-Apocalypto, an animatic YouTube series self-produced by the duo